Bear Grove Township may refer to the following townships in the United States:

 Bear Grove Township, Fayette County, Illinois
 Bear Grove Township, Cass County, Iowa
 Bear Grove Township, Guthrie County, Iowa